Isle of Normandy or Normandy Island or Normandy Isles or Normandy Isle is a neighborhood of North Beach in the city of Miami Beach, Florida.  It is located along the eastern shore of Biscayne Bay.

Geography

History
After building a chain of movie theaters in Cincinnati, Alsace native Henri Levi (or Levy) moved to Miami Beach in 1922. In 1926 he undertook a 2-year period of 24-hour-a-day dredging to create Normandy Isle from the natural swampy land mass in Biscayne Bay west of 71st street theretofore called Warner-Meade Island. Levy was also instrumental in the construction of the 79th Street Causeway.

Streets

Most streets on Normandy Isle were named after French cities and architectural landmarks.

East-West

Bay Drive
Biarritz Drive
Biarritz Court
71st Street (originally Everglades Concourse)
Maimonides Street
Everglades Court (alley)
Normandy Drive
Normandy Court
Marseille Drive
Calais Drive

North-South

Brest Esplanade
Rue Vendome
Vendome Court
Rue Versailles
Versailles Court
Vichy Drive
Rue Notre Dame
Rue Bordeaux
Trouville Esplanade
Rue Granville
Verdun Drive

Education
Miami-Dade County Public Schools is the local school district. Treasure Island Elementary School in North Bay Village serves Normandy Island. Miami Beach Nautilus Middle School and Miami Beach Senior High School serve Normandy Island.

Notable residents
 Joan Field, concert violinist
 Roy Firestone, sportscaster and entertainer
 David M. Gersten, appeals court judge
 Bob Mover, jazz saxophonist
 Clifford S. Perlman, restaurateur
 Daniel Schechter, psychiatrist and author

References

Neighborhoods in Miami Beach, Florida
Islands of Miami Beach, Florida